Leverett Glacier in Antarctica is about  long and  wide, draining northward from the Watson Escarpment, between California Plateau and Stanford Plateau, and then trending west-northwest between the Tapley Mountains and Harold Byrd Mountains to terminate at the head of the Ross Ice Shelf close east of Scott Glacier. It was discovered in December 1929 by the Byrd Antarctic Expedition geological party under Laurence Gould, and named by him for Frank Leverett, an eminent geologist at the University of Michigan and an authority on the glacial geology of the central United States.

Leverett Glacier is on the route through the Transantarctic Mountains for the McMurdo – South Pole Highway, an overland supply route between McMurdo Station and Amundsen–Scott South Pole Station.

See also
 List of glaciers in the Antarctic
 Russell-Leverett Glacier (Greenland)

References

Glaciers of Marie Byrd Land